Daniel de Oliveira may refer to:

 Daniel de Oliveira (actor) (born 1977), Brazilian actor
 Daniel De Oliveira (chess player) (born 1931), Portuguese chess player
 Daniel de Oliveira (footballer) (born 1970), Venezuelan footballer

See also
 Daniel Oliveira (disambiguation)